Patrick Brady (11 March 1936 – 24 August 2020) was an Irish professional footballer who played with Millwall, QPR and Gravesend & Northfleet.

Playing career
Brady was signed by Millwall in 1959 from Home Farm. His brother Ray had joined Millwall in 1957. Brady moved with his brother Ray to QPR in 1963.
Brady signed by Alec Stock for QPR from Millwall in 1963 and made his debut in October of that year against Hull City. In all Brady made 62 league appearances for QPR. He finished his playing career at Gravesend & Northfleet.

Personal life
His brothers Ray and Liam and his great uncle Frank Brady Sr. were all Irish internationals. Another brother Frank Brady Jr played for Shamrock Rovers.

In the 1970s, he spent some time as an Economics teacher at Brockley County Grammar School in south east London.
He also taught General Education at Paragon boys school in the late 1970s.

Brady died on 24 August 2020 after a long illness.

References 

1936 births
2020 deaths
Association footballers from Dublin (city)
Association football defenders
Republic of Ireland association footballers
Queens Park Rangers F.C. players
Millwall F.C. players
Ebbsfleet United F.C. players
English Football League players
Pat
Home Farm F.C. players